Old Occitan, also called Old Provençal, was the earliest form of the Occitano-Romance languages, as attested in writings dating from the eighth through the fourteenth centuries. Old Occitan generally includes Early and Old Occitan. Middle Occitan is sometimes included in Old Occitan, sometimes in Modern Occitan. As the term  appeared around the year 1300, Old Occitan is referred to as "Romance" or "Provençal" in medieval texts.

History

Among the earliest records of Occitan are the Tomida femina, the Boecis and the Cançó de Santa Fe. Old Occitan, the language used by the troubadours, was the first Romance language with a literary corpus and had an enormous influence on the development of lyric poetry in other European languages. The interpunct was a feature of its orthography and survives today in Catalan and Gascon.

The official language of the sovereign principality of the Viscounty of Béarn was the local vernacular Bearnès dialect of Old Occitan. It was the spoken language of law courts and of business and it was the written language of customary law. Although vernacular languages were increasingly preferred to Latin in western Europe in the late Middle Ages, the status of Occitan in Béarn was unusual because its use was required by law: "lawyers will draft their petitions and pleas in the vernacular language of the present country, both in speech and in writing".

Old Catalan and Old Occitan diverged between the 11th and the 14th centuries.

Phonology
Old Occitan changed and evolved somewhat during its history, but the basic sound system can be summarised as follows:

Consonants

Notes:
Word-final  may sometimes represent , as in gaug "joy" (also spelled gauch).

Vowels

Monophthongs

 Original /u/ fronted to /y/. When this occurred is unclear: some scholars prefer the tenth or eleventh century, while others favour the thirteenth century. Either way, original /o/ subsequently raised to the vacated position, becoming /u/. Both phonemes maintained their original spelling (⟨u⟩ for /y/, ⟨u⟩ for /o/), although in the fourteenth century the spelling ⟨ou⟩ was introduced for /u/ under French influence.
 The open-mid vowels  and  diphthongized in stressed position when followed by a semivowel, and sporadically elsewhere, but retained their value as separate vowel phonemes with minimal pairs such as pèl /pɛl/ "skin" and pel /pel/ "hair".

Diphthongs and triphthongs

Graphemics

Old occitan is a non-standardised language regarding its spelling, meaning that different graphemic signs can represent one sound and vice versa. For example:

Morphology

Some notable characteristics of Old Occitan:
 It had a two-case system (nominative and oblique), as in Old French, with the oblique derived from the Latin accusative case. The declensional categories were also similar to those of Old French; for example, the Latin third-declension nouns with stress shift between the nominative and accusative were maintained in Old Occitan only in nouns referring to people.
 There were two distinct conditional tenses: a "first conditional", similar to the conditional tense in other Romance language, and a "second conditional", derived from the Latin pluperfect indicative tense. The second conditional is cognate with the literary pluperfect in Portuguese, the -ra imperfect subjunctive in Spanish, the second preterite of very early Old French (Sequence of Saint Eulalia) and probably the future perfect in modern Gascon.

Extracts
 From Bertran de Born's  (translated by James H. Donalson):

See also
Occitan conjugation
Occitan phonology

Further reading
 Frede Jensen. The Syntax of Medieval Occitan, 2nd edn. De Gruyter, 2015 (1st edn. Tübingen: Niemeyer, 1986). Beihefte zur Zeitschrift für romanische Philologie 208. 978-3-484-52208-4.
 French translation: Frede Jensen. Syntaxe de l'ancien occitan. Tübingen: Niemeyer, 1994.
 William D. Paden. An Introduction to Old Occitan. Modern Language Association of America, 1998. .

 Povl Skårup. Morphologie élémentaire de l'ancien occitan. Museum Tusculanum Press, 1997, 
 Nathaniel B. Smith & Thomas Goddard Bergin. An Old Provençal Primer. Garland, 1984, 
 Kathrin Kraller. Sprachgeschichte als Kommunikationsgeschichte: Volkssprachliche Notarurkunden des Mittelalters in ihren Kontexten. Mit einer Analyse der okzitanischen Urkundensprache und der Graphie. Universität Regensburg, 2019,

References

External links
A site with a presentation of Old Occitan

Occitan language
Romance languages
Occitan, Old
Old Occitan literature
Languages attested from the 8th century